Patrick DeAndrea Pass (born December 31, 1977) is an American football coach and former fullback, who is currently the director of football personnel development for the Massachusetts Pirates of the Indoor Football League (IFL). He was drafted by the New England Patriots in the seventh round of the 2000 NFL Draft. He played college football at Georgia. He has also been a member of the New York Giants and the Houston Texans.

Early years
Pass attended Tucker High School in Tucker, Georgia, and lettered in football and baseball. In football, he was a three-year starter at running back, and as a senior, he was also named as an All-USA selection by USA Today.

College career
Pass attended the University of Georgia, where he played football as a running back, quarterback, receiver, and kick returner. Before his freshman season, he was drafted by the Florida Marlins in the 1996 Major League Baseball draft, and played that summer in the Marlins' farm system. He played again in the Marlins' minor league system before his sophomore and junior seasons in 1997 and 1998.

Professional career
Pass was drafted by the Patriots as a running back in the seventh round of the 2000 NFL Draft. He spent two weeks on the Patriots' practice squad in 2000 before being activated. In his first start on November 19, Pass played as a running back, wide receiver, and special teamer, recording 39 rushing yards, 16 receiving yards, and two special teams tackles. In the 2002 off-season, Pass put on 35 pounds and made the transition to fullback, where he would start for the 2004 team. In 2005, with top rusher Corey Dillon injured, Pass would see time as a running back, recording a career-high 245 rushing yards that season. However, Pass himself would miss time in 2005 with a hamstring injury suffered against the Buffalo Bills on October 31. In 2006, Pass continued to struggle with the injury, being placed on the Physically Unable to Perform list, and being limited to just three games before going on injured reserve. Pass also saw time as a kick returner in his time with the Patriots, returning 36 kickoffs for 745 yards.

Pass signed with the Houston Texans before the start of the 2007 NFL season; the Texans released him on August 29, 2007. Pass was signed by the New York Giants on November 20, 2007, playing in one game before being released on November 27, 2007.

After spending the 2008 NFL season out of football, Pass signed again with the Patriots on June 4, 2009. He was released a week later, on June 11 and retired from the NFL.

Coaching career
In 2012, Pass became the head coach of the Boston Freedom Fighters, a team in the new Professional Developmental Spring League called the "National Spring Football League".

In 2020, Pass was hired as the head coach for the Massachusetts Pirates, at the time a member of the National Arena League.  Though the 2020 season was cancelled because of the COVID-19 pandemic, Pass would be hired again as the Pirates' head coach for 2021, their first season in the Indoor Football League.  Pass would lead the Pirates to an 11-3 regular season record and a 37-34 victory over the Arizona Rattlers in the 2021 United Bowl, the Pirates' first championship in franchise history. In 2022, Pass transitioned to become the director of football personnel development for the Pirates.

References

External links
New England Patriots bio
 

African-American baseball players
African-American players of American football
American football fullbacks
Georgia Bulldogs football players
New England Patriots players
Houston Texans players
New York Giants players
1977 births
Living people
Tucker High School alumni
Players of American football from Atlanta
Baseball players from Atlanta
Utica Blue Sox players
21st-century African-American sportspeople
20th-century African-American sportspeople